Stanley 157 is an Indian reserve of the Lac La Ronge Indian Band in Saskatchewan. It is 56 kilometres northeast of Lac la Ronge. In the 2016 Canadian Census, it recorded a population of 1840 living in 451 of its 466 total private dwellings. In the same year, its Community Well-Being index was calculated at 52 of 100, compared to 58.4 for the average First Nations community and 77.5 for the average non-Indigenous community.

References

Indian reserves in Saskatchewan
Division No. 18, Saskatchewan